Julien Vercauteren (born 12 January 1993) is a Belgian professional footballer who currently plays for Spanish club CD Marino. He plays as a winger. Besides Belgium, he has played in France, Croatia, and Spain.

Career
Vercauteren made his top flight debut during the 2012–13 season.

He joined Ligue 1 club OGC Nice in June 2014.

In May 2022, Vercauteren was one of five players secretly filmed by a BBC undercover reporter agreeing to spot–fix football games. Vercauteren and three other players in the meeting told the undercover journalist that they had spot–fixed before.

References

External links
 

Living people
1993 births
People from Sint-Agatha-Berchem
Association football wingers
Belgian footballers
Belgian Pro League players
Challenger Pro League players
Belgian Third Division players
Lierse S.K. players
K.V.C. Westerlo players
Royale Union Saint-Gilloise players
R.E. Virton players
R.W.D.M. Brussels F.C. players
Ligue 1 players
Championnat National 2 players
OGC Nice players
RNK Split players
Segunda División B players
CD Marino players
Belgian expatriate footballers
Belgian expatriate sportspeople in France
Belgian expatriate sportspeople in Croatia
Belgian expatriate sportspeople in Spain
Expatriate footballers in France
Expatriate footballers in Croatia
Expatriate footballers in Spain
Footballers from Brussels